James Logan may refer to:

Politics and military
 James Logan (c. 1723–1780), assumed name of Logan (Iroquois leader), adopted from the statesman
 James Logan (c. 1776–1812), Shawnee warrior better known as Captain Logan
 James Logan (pioneer) (1791–1859), American pioneer and statesman
 James Logan (statesman) (1674–1751), colonial American statesman
 James Kenneth Logan (1929–2018), U.S. federal judge
 James M. Logan (1920–1999), American soldier and Medal of Honor recipient

Sports
 James Logan (footballer, born 1870) (1870–1896), Scottish striker who scored a hat-trick in the 1894 FA Cup Final
 James Logan (footballer, born 1884) (1884–1968), Scottish half back/full back (Aston Villa, Rangers)
 James Logan (footballer, born 1885) (1885–1961), Scottish forward/half back (Bradford City, Chesterfield, Bradford PA, Raith Rovers) and manager (Raith, Wrexham)
 James Logan (American football) (born 1972), American football player
 James Logan (ice hockey) (born 1933), Canadian ice hockey player
 James Logan (cricketer) (born 1997), English cricketer

Others
 James Logan (trustee) (1864–1931), American school official
 James Logan (writer) (1797–1872), Scottish author on Gaelic culture
 James C. Logan (1914–1997), Grand Prytanis of Tau Kappa Epsilon from 1953 to 1957
 James Harvey Logan (1841–1928), American horticulturist
 James Richardson Logan (1819–1869), British lawyer and amateur ethnologist
 James Kennedy Logan (1844–1912), New Zealand inspector and superintendent of telegraphs

See also
 James Logan High School, a high school in Union City, California
 Wolverine (character), uses the alias "Logan" in X-Men comics and associated media, and is born as James Howlett
 Jim Logan (disambiguation)